Reza DavoudNejad (born 19 May 1980 in Tehran) is an Iranian actor and TV presenter. He is the son of Alireza DavoudNejad, Iranian cinema director and former brother-in-law of Asal Badiee, Iranian deceased actress.

See also 
Iranian cinema
IRIB

References

1981 births
Living people
People from Tehran
Iranian child actors
Iranian male film actors
Iranian male television actors